Jakob Gijsbert "Jaap" de Hoop Scheffer  (born 3 April 1948) is a Dutch retired politician, jurist and diplomat who served as the eleventh Secretary General of NATO from January 2004 to August 2009. A member of the Christian Democratic Appeal (CDA), which he led from March 1997 to October 2001, he served as Minister of Foreign Affairs from July 2002 until December 2003 under Prime Minister Jan Peter Balkenende.

De Hoop Scheffer studied law at Leiden University obtaining a Master of Laws degree before he worked as a civil servant and diplomat for the Ministry of Foreign Affairs and the diplomatic service from October 1976 until June 1986. In the general election of 1986 he was elected as a member of the House of Representatives, where he served a frontbencher and spokesperson for foreign and European affairs. After party leader and parliamentary leader Enneüs Heerma stepped down De Hoop Scheffer was selected as his successor on 27 March 1997; he was the party's lijsttrekker (top candidate) for the election of 1998. Following an internal power struggle with party chairman Marnix van Rij before an upcoming general election De Hoop Scheffer announced that he was stepping down as leader and  would not stand at the election.

De Hoop Scheffer continued to be active in politics and was appointed as Minister of Foreign Affairs in the Cabinet Balkenende I taking office on 22 July 2002. The cabinet Balkenende I fell just 87 days into its term. After the election of 2003 De Hoop Scheffer continued his office in the Cabinet Balkenende II. In September 2003 De Hoop Scheffer was nominated as the next Secretary General of NATO serving from 1 January 2004 until 1 August 2009.

De Hoop Scheffer retired from active politics at 61 and became active in the private and public sectors as a corporate and non-profit director served on several state commissions and councils and as a occasional diplomat and lobbyist for several economic delegations on behalf of the government, he also worked as a distinguished professor of International relations, Diplomatic Practice and Governmental Studies at his alma mater Leiden University from September 2009 until September 2014. He is still involved with his alma mater as a Distinguished Fellow at Leiden University College The Hague.

Following his retirement, De Hoop Scheffer continues to be active as a advocate and lobbyist for more European integration and improved Transatlantic relations. De Hoop Scheffer is known for his abilities as an effective negotiator and skilful manager. De Hoop Scheffer was granted the honorary title of Minister of State on 22 June 2018 and as of  continues to comment on political affairs as a statesman.

Early life

De Hoop Scheffer attended the Ignatius Gymnasium in Amsterdam from March 1961 until April 1966 and applied at the Leiden University in June 1968 majoring in Law and obtaining an Bachelor of Laws degree in June 1970 before graduating with an Master of Laws degree in July 1974. De Hoop Scheffer was conscripted in the Royal Netherlands Air Force serving as a Second lieutenant from August 1974 until September 1976. De Hoop Scheffer worked as a civil servant for the Diplomatic service of the Ministry of Foreign Affairs from October 1976 until June 1986 as an Attaché in Accra, Ghana from October 1976 until April 1978 and in Brussels, Belgium for the NATO delegation from April 1978 until December 1980 and as secretary to the Minister of Foreign Affairs from December 1980 until June 1986.

Political career

Member of Tweede Kamer
De Hoop Scheffer was a member of the social liberal Democrats 66 (D66) party from 1979 until 1982 until he became a member of the Christian Democratic Appeal (CDA). After the election of 1986 De Hoop Scheffer was elected as a Member of the House of Representatives on 3 June 1986 and served as a frontbencher chairing the parliamentary committee for Development Cooperation and parliamentary committee for Foreign Affairs and was spokesperson for Foreign Affairs, European Affairs, NATO, Development Cooperation and Development aid.

Leader of Christian Democratic Appeal (1997-2001)
After the Leader of the Christian Democratic Appeal and Parliamentary leader of the CDA in the Tweede Kamer Enneüs Heerma announced that he was stepping down as Leader and Parliamentary leader following increasing criticism on his leadership, the CDA leadership approached De Hoop Scheffer as a candidate to succeed him. De Hoop Scheffer accepted and became Leader and Parliamentary leader on 27 March 1997.

For the election of 1998 De Hoop Scheffer served as Lijsttrekker (top candidate) and the CDA suffered a loss, losing 5 seats and now had 29 seats in the Tweede Kamer. On 1 October 2001 De Hoop Scheffer announced that he was stepping down as Leader and Parliamentary leader following an internal power struggle with the Party Chairman Marnix van Rij and that he would not stand for the election of 2002.

Dutch Foreign Minister
The CDA won in the 2002 elections and played the leading role in the formation of a new coalition government. The new Prime Minister Balkenende appointed De Hoop Scheffer as foreign minister in his short-lived first cabinet, a position he retained in the second Balkenende cabinet after the elections of 22 January 2003.

In 2003, the foreign policy of the Netherlands was largely determined by De Hoop Scheffer and Balkenende. Its main foreign policy decision was to contribute to Operation Iraqi Freedom, although its formulation ("political" but not "military" support) gave it an ambivalent character. However, 1,100 Dutch servicemen were deployed as part of the Stabilisation Force Iraq in the southern province of Al Muthanna from 2003 till 2005, and two of them were killed in action.

In 2003 Jaap de Hoop Scheffer was also the Chairman-in-Office of the Organization for Security and Co-operation in Europe.

NATO Secretary General (2004-2009)
He became the 11th NATO Secretary General on 5 January 2004, succeeding Lord Robertson, who held the post from 1999 until 2003. The announcement was made on 22 September 2003. As Secretary General, De Hoop Scheffer urged NATO members to contribute more to NATO operations such as the International Security Assistance Force in Afghanistan. He "informed a NATO conference that 'NATO troops have to guard pipelines that transport oil and gas that is directed for the West,' and more generally to protect sea routes used by tankers and other 'crucial infrastructure' of the energy system".

On 21 June 2007, De Hoop Scheffer attended an economic conference in Montreal where he encouraged Canada to continue its military mission in Afghanistan past its 2009 withdrawal date. He said, "I think more time is necessary to create those conditions for reconstruction and development to go on." His visit coincided with the death of three more Canadian soldiers in Afghanistan. "I know how dramatic it is if Canadian soldiers pay the highest price, but I still say, you are there for a good cause." De Hoop Scheffer's comments were made as the Harper government was under pressure by opposition politicians to define the length of Canada's commitment to the mission in Afghanistan.

It has been alleged by Iran that Jaap de Hoop Scheffer met Jundallah leader Abdolmalek Rigi while he was visiting Afghanistan in 2008 amid Iranian accusations that the CIA was backing the terrorist group. This accusation was later denied by NATO.

On 21 July 2009 De Hoop Scheffer suffered a heart attack. He underwent angioplasty after which he was reported to be in stable condition.

His successor, Anders Fogh Rasmussen, took office on 1 August 2009.

Post-political career
On 1 September 2009 De Hoop Scheffer was appointed to the Pieter Kooijmans Chair for Peace, Law and Security at Leiden University. The appointment is part-time, and the holder of this chair is appointed for a maximum of three years.

In addition, De Hoop Scheffer has held a variety of paid and unpaid positions, including: 
 Air France–KLM, Independent Member of the Board of Directors
 Bahrain Center for Strategic, International and Energy Studies (DERASAT), Member of the International Advisory Board
 Friends of Europe, Member of the Board of Trustees
 Trilateral Commission, Member of the European Group

Honours and awards
  Knight of the Order of Orange-Nassau (Netherlands, 22 May 2002)
  Officer of the Order of Orange-Nassau (Netherlands, 12 December 2003)
  Knight Grand Cross of the Order of Orange-Nassau (Netherlands, 6 July 2009, for his services as Secretary General of NATO)
  Order of the Balkan Mountains, First Class (Bulgaria, 2009)
  Grand Order of King Tomislav (Croatia, 5 February 2009, "for outstanding contribution to strengthening the international position of the Republic of Croatia and the promotion of cooperation between NATO and the Republic of Croatia")
  Grand Cross of the Order of the Cross of Terra Mariana (Estonia, 6 July 2009)
  Knight Grand Cross of the Order of Merit of the Italian Republic (Italy, 16 February 2009)
  Grand Officer of the Order of the Three Stars (Latvia, November 2004, for his commitment to a United Europe)
  Grand Cross of the Order of Vytautas the Great (Lithuania, 26 June 2009)
  Grand Cross of the Order of Merit of the Republic of Poland (Poland, 12 March 2009)
  Grand Cross of the Order of the Star of Romania (Romania, 10 May 2004)
  Member 1st Class of the Order of the White Double Cross (Slovakia, 2009)
  Order for Exceptional Merits (Slovenia, 2009)
  Honorary Knight Commander of the Order of St Michael and St George (United Kingdom, 10 February 2010, for his services to NATO)

References

External links

 NATO Declassified - Jaap de Hoop Scheffer (biography)
 Appointment as Secretary General - NATO announcement
 Profile of Jaap de Hoop Scheffer  - by journalist Robert van de Roer, NATO website

|-

|-

|-

1948 births
Living people
Businesspeople from Amsterdam
Christian Democratic Appeal politicians
Democrats 66 politicians
Dutch corporate directors
Dutch expatriates in Belgium
Dutch expatriates in England
Dutch expatriates in Ghana
Dutch lobbyists
Dutch nonprofit directors
Dutch nonprofit executives
Governmental studies academics
Grand Crosses of the Order of Merit of the Republic of Poland
Grand Crosses of the Order of the Star of Romania
Grand Crosses of the Order of Vytautas the Great
Honorary Knights Commander of the Order of St Michael and St George
Dutch international relations scholars
Knights Grand Cross of the Order of Merit of the Italian Republic
Knights Grand Cross of the Order of Orange-Nassau
Leaders of the Christian Democratic Appeal
Leiden University alumni
Academic staff of Leiden University
Members of the House of Representatives (Netherlands)
Ministers of Foreign Affairs of the Netherlands
Ministers of State (Netherlands)
Organization for Security and Co-operation in Europe
Politicians from Amsterdam
Recipients of the Order of the Cross of Terra Mariana, 1st Class
Royal Netherlands Air Force officers
Scholars of diplomacy
Secretaries General of NATO
20th-century Dutch civil servants
20th-century Dutch diplomats
20th-century Dutch military personnel
20th-century Dutch politicians
21st-century Dutch businesspeople
21st-century Dutch diplomats
Diplomats from Amsterdam
21st-century Dutch politicians